The 2005 Guangzhou International Women's Open was a tennis tournament played on outdoor hard courts. It was the 2nd edition of the Guangzhou International Women's Open, and was a Tier III event on the 2005 WTA Tour. It was held in Guangzhou, China, from September 26 through October 2, 2005. Total prize money for the tournament was $170,000.

Singles main-draw entrants

Seeds 

 1 Seeds are based on the rankings of September 15, 2005.

Other entrants 
The following players received wildcards into the singles main draw
  Chen Yan-chong
  Xie Yan-ze

The following players received entry from the singles qualifying draw:
  Victoria Azarenka
  Janet Lee
  Sun Shengnan
  Yuan Meng

The following player received entry as a Lucky loser from the singles qualifying draw:
  Ivana Lisjak

Finals results

Singles 

 Yan Zi def.  Nuria Llagostera Vives, 6–4, 4–0, ret.
Yan won the first WTA title of her career.

Doubles 

 Maria Elena Camerin /  Emmanuelle Gagliardi def.  Neha Uberoi /  Shikha Uberoi, 7–6(7–5), 6–3

References

External links
Official website
2005 Results on the ITF
  2005 Luxembourg, Guangzhou & Seoul WTA Singles Results     Kim Clijsters, Zi Yan, & N Vaidisova, Champions

Guangzhou International Women's Open
2007
Guangzhou International Women's Open, 2005
Guangzhou International Women's Open, 2005